The 42nd Sports Emmy Awards were presented by the National Academy of Television Arts and Sciences (NATAS), honoring the best in American sports television coverage in 2020. The winners were announced on June 8, 2021, via live-stream at Watch.TheEmmys.TV and other apps associated.

The nominations were announced on April 20, 2021, with ESPN being the network with more nominations with 41 and the Super Bowl LV being the most nominated program, with 11.

Winners and nominees
The nominees were announced on April 20, 2021. Winners in each category are listed first, in boldface.

Programming

Personality

Technical

Multiple wins

Multiple nominations

References

External links
 Daytime Emmys website

 042
Sports Emmy Awards
Emmy Awards